With the Spanish classification system for locomotive wheel arrangements, the system for steam machines.

Steam 

With steam locomotives, there are three digits normally and more with articulated locomotives. The digits are written one after another since there are never so many axles to cause confusion.

The first digit corresponds to the number of leading unpowered axles.

The second digit corresponds to the number of powered axles.

The third digit corresponds to the number of trailing unpowered axles.

Examples 

Thus:

0-6-0 becomes 030

2-6-0 becomes 130

0-8-0 becomes 040 'Verraco'

4-6-2 becomes 231 'Pacific'

2-8-0 becomes 140 'Consolidación'

2-8-2 becomes 141 'Mikado'

4-8-0 becomes 240 'Mastodonte'

4-8-2 becomes 241 'Montaña'

4-8-4 becomes 242 'Confederación'

2-10-2 becomes 151 'Santa Fé'

2-6-6-2 becomes 130+031

See also 

 UIC classification

Locomotive classification systems
Locomotives of Spain